Scrobipalpa caucasica is a moth in the family Gelechiidae. It was described by Povolný in 2001. The moth is found in the northern Caucasus.

References

Scrobipalpa
Moths described in 2001